The family Dendropithecidae is an extinct family of catarrhine monkeys. They date from the Early Miocene, around 20 - 12 million years ago.

Fossils of the two Dendropithecus species, Dendropithecus macinnesi and Dendropithecus ugandensis, have been found in East Africa, including several partial skeletons of Dendropithecus macinnesi on Rusinga Island in Lake Victoria. Other species are Simiolus andrewsi, Simiolus cheptumoae, Simiolus enjiessi. Micropithecus clarki and Micropithecus leakeyorum may not be part Dendropithecidae, and may be sister to the crown Catarrhini (or, depending on the definition, the apes and the Cercopithecidae may have emerged in the Dendropithecidae). The later Nyanzapithecinae (including Oreopithecus († 7 Ma)) appear to be sister to Simiolus.

Description
The taxa included in Dendropithecidae, possess the following traits:
 Upper and lower canines strongly bilaterally compressed
 P3 moderately to strongly specialized for sectoriality
 Slender limb bones
 Humerus with a relatively straight shaft
 Medial epicondyle of the humerus is large and medially directed
 Epitrochlear fossa is well developed
 Zona conoidea is broad and shallow
 Trochlear articular surface exhibits minimal spooling
 Olecranon fossa is shallow

Micropithecus appears to be sister to the crown catarrhini.

References 

Miocene primates
Pliocene primates
Miocene extinctions
Prehistoric apes
Primate families
Prehistoric mammal families